Charles Robert Crowe (12 October 1867 – 3 September 1953) was a Canadian sport shooter, who competed in the 1908 Summer Olympics. He was born and died in Guelph, Ontario.

In the 1908 Olympics he won a bronze medal in the team military rifle event and was 9th in 1000 yard free rifle event. He is buried in Woodlawn Cemetery in Guelph, Ontario.

References

External links
profile

1867 births
1953 deaths
Sportspeople from Guelph
Canadian male sport shooters
Olympic shooters of Canada
Shooters at the 1908 Summer Olympics
Olympic bronze medalists for Canada
Olympic medalists in shooting
Medalists at the 1908 Summer Olympics
20th-century Canadian people